Llacanora District is one of twelve districts of the province Cajamarca in Peru.

See also 
 Sulluqucha

References

Climbing areas of Peru